List of National Heritage Sites of Israel, as designated by the government of the State of Israel:
Atlit detainee camp, Atlit: Detention center for Jewish immigrants seeking refuge in Palestine during the Mandated period.
Hurvat Anim
Tel Hazor
Cave of the Patriarchs, Hebron: Traditional burial place of Abraham, Sarah, Isaac, Rebeccah, Jacob and Leah.
Qumran Caves
Rachel's Tomb, Bethlehem: Traditional burial place of the Hebrew matriarch Rachel.

References

 
National Heritage Sites
National Heritage Sites